Hoon is an Australian and New Zealand derogatory term for people who engage in anti-social behaviours.

Hoon may also refer to:
 Hoon, Derbyshire, England
 Hoon, Iran, village in Hormozgan Province, Iran
 Hun (instrument), traditional Korean wind instrument
 Hoon (fiction) (ab-Guthatsa-ul-Rousit), fictional extraterrestrial race from David Brin's Uplift Universe
 Hoon (Korean name), Korean masculine given name
 Hoon, a functional programming language used in the Urbit computing system.

People with the family name Hoon:
 Geoff Hoon (born 1953), British politician
 Pierra Hoon (born 1909), first Thai woman physician
 Shannon Hoon (1967–1995), lead singer of the band Blind Melon

See also
 Gordon Chung-Hoon, United States Navy officer
 Ah Hoon (died 1909), Chinese American comedian